is a railway station on the Keio Inokashira Line in Setagaya, Tokyo, Japan, operated by the private railway operator Keio Corporation.

Lines

Service pattern
Only all-stations "Local" services stop at this station.

Station layout
The station consists of a ground-level island platform serving two tracks. It is an above-ground station, with the station building built above the tracks. In March 2006, the station underwent construction to improve accessibility. The station has two exits, so this construction installed three elevators,  between the platform and concourse, between the concourse and north exit, and between the concourse and south exit. On the north-side exit there is only an elevator, and no stairs.

The toilets were previously located on the platform, but during the overall renovations of the station they were moved to the upper level, inside the ticket gates. At the same time, a multi-purpose toilet was added.

Platforms

History
The station opened on August 1, 1933.

From 22 February 2013, station numbering was introduced on Keio lines, with Ikenoue Station becoming "IN04".

Passenger statistics
In fiscal 2011, the station was used by an average of 9,334 passengers daily.

The passenger figures for previous years are as shown below.

Surrounding area 
 Shoin Junior and Senior High School

References

External links

 Ikenoue Station information (Keio) 

Railway stations in Japan opened in 1933
Stations of Keio Corporation
Keio Inokashira Line
Railway stations in Tokyo